The monthly journal az-Zuhūr (Arabic: الزهور; DMG: az-Zuhūr; English: "Flowers") was published in Cairo from 1910 until 1913. Altogether, 40 issues exist. The editor Anṭūn al-Ǧumayyil (1887-1948) did already participate in the publication of the Beirutian magazine Al Bashir and the Egyptian newspaper Al-Ahram.

Literature and art were the main focus whereat the journal mainly tried to support young authors and to improve the relationship between Arab writers from different regions. In addition az-Zuhūr wanted to keep the balance between European and contemporary Arabic literature like some other later popular journals.

Beside literary criticism, book reviews and news about the literary life in Egypt, the authors stand up for the establishment and enhancement of the Egyptian theatre. Az-Zuhūr was the first journal to publish in its series a play of Shakespeare, Julius Caesar. Until the cut-off in 1913 the journal organized numerous writing competitions which helped to achieve more popularity. Eventually az-Zuhūr was able to add a significant contribution to the Egyptian literary life.

References

External links

1910 establishments in Egypt
1913 disestablishments in Egypt
Arabic-language magazines
Defunct literary magazines published in Egypt
Magazines established in 1910
Magazines disestablished in 1913
Magazines published in Cairo
Monthly magazines published in Egypt
Visual arts magazines